Wola Uhruska  is a village in Włodawa County, Lublin Voivodeship, in eastern Poland, close to the border with Ukraine. It is the seat of the gmina (administrative district) called Gmina Wola Uhruska.

References

Villages in Włodawa County